Cereatta elegans is a harvestman species in the genus Cereatta found in Cameroon.

See also
 List of Assamiidae species

References

 Cereatta elegans on us.mirror.gbif.org
 Cereatta on www.biologie.uni-ulm.de
 Assamiidae on Joel Hallan's Biology Catalog

External links

Harvestmen
Animals described in 1935
Invertebrates of Cameroon